Dwight Eind (born December 2, 1983 in Haarlem) is a Dutch footballer who played for Eerste Divisie club FC Omniworld during the 2005-2007 seasons.

Club career
Eind played two seasons in the Dutch Eerste Divisie for Omniworld before joining Belgian side Dessel Sport. After returning to Holland, he played for amateur sides Sparta Nijkerk, Veensche Boys and Waterwijk and started working for the Almere municipality.

References

External links
Voetbal International profile

1983 births
Living people
Footballers from Haarlem
Dutch sportspeople of Surinamese descent
Association football midfielders
Dutch footballers
Almere City FC players
K.F.C. Dessel Sport players
Eerste Divisie players
Dutch expatriate footballers
Expatriate footballers in Belgium
Dutch expatriate sportspeople in Belgium
Sparta Nijkerk players